Ryan Nicholson (1971 – October 8, 2019) was a Canadian special effects makeup artist and filmmaker.

Biography 
Nicholson was born in 1971 in Victoria, British Columbia. He was a self-taught artist who ran special-effects shop Flesh & Fantasy for a number of years before he began directing and producing his own independent films through his production company Plotdigger Films.

He was married to Megan Nicholson and had one son.

Television
Nicholson worked in the makeup department on many television shows including The X-Files, The Outer Limits, Stargate and Andromeda for which he was nominated for the Gemini Award three times for Best Achievement in Make-Up, with a win in 2002.

Film
Nicholson contributed to Scary Movie and Final Destination films, in addition to Elf, Blade: Trinity and The Chronicles of Riddick.

Nicholson also wrote, produced, and directed several films under the banner of his production company Plotdigger Films, including Torched, Gutterballs, Live Feed, Hanger, Nature and others.

Death
Nicholson died from brain cancer at age 47 on October 8, 2019.

Filmography

References

External links

Plotdigger Films Inc. - The independent horror and grindhouse films of Ryan Nicholson
Official web site for "Star Vehicle"

1971 births
2019 deaths
21st-century Canadian screenwriters
Canadian make-up artists
Canadian male screenwriters
Film producers from British Columbia
Place of death missing
Canadian Screen Award winners
Deaths from brain tumor
Film directors from Victoria, British Columbia
Special effects people
Writers from Victoria, British Columbia